The following is a timeline of the history of the city of Liverpool, England.

Prior to 18th century

 1089. The West Derby Hundred is recorded in the Domesday Book
 1207 – 28 August: Liverpool and its market chartered by King John.
 1229 – Charter granted by Henry III authorizing a merchants’ gild.
 1237 – Liverpool Castle, (1237–1726).
 1266 – Liverpool passed into the hands of Edmund Crouchback, Earl of Lancaster.
 1292 – John De More becomes Lord Mayor of Liverpool.
 1295 – Borough sent two members to the first royal parliament,
 1298 – Liverpool fair active.
 1349 – The Black Death plague hits Liverpool.
 1588 – Borough represented in Parliament by Francis Bacon.
 1598 – Speke Hall (house) built.
 1662 – Population: 775.
 1644 – Town besieged by forces of Prince Rupert of the Rhine.
 1674 – Town Hall rebuilt.
1684 – Richard Atherton becomes Lord Mayor of Liverpool and secures the surrender of the Liverpool Charter, which was delivered to George Jeffreys, 1st Baron Jeffreys, known as Judge Jeffreys at Bewsey Old Hall in 1684. The notes on the Liverpool Charters refer to Atherton as the first modern Mayor of Liverpool.

18th century
 1700 
 Liverpool Merchant slave ship begins operating.
 Population: 5,714.
 1702 – Croxteth Hall (house) built.
 1704 – Woolton Hall (house) built.
 1708 – Blue Coat School founded.
 1715 – opening of the first dock Old Dock.
 1717 – Bluecoat Chambers built.
 1718 – Blue Coat hospital opens.
 1720 – Population: 10,446.
 1722 – Ranelagh Gardens open.
 1724 – 25 August: Animal painter George Stubbs born.
 1726
 Liverpool Castle demolished.
 Ye Hole in Ye Wall pub on Hackins Hey opens.
 1749 – Royal Infirmary opens.
 1753 – Salthouse Dock opens.
 1754 – Liverpool Town Hall built.
 1756 – Liverpool Advertiser newspaper begins publication.
 1758 – Circulating library established.
 1766 – City directory published.
 1770s – Scotland Road laid out.
 1771
 Bidston lighthouse built.
 George's Dock opens.
 1772 – Theatre built.
 1778/9 – 120 privateers were fitted out in Liverpool, carrying 1986 guns and 8745 men.
 1779 – Medical Library founded.
 1784 – Liverpool Musical Festival begins.
 1785 – Liverpool Georgian Quarter constructed.
 1788 – St. Peter's Roman Catholic Church built.
 1790
 Lime Street laid out.
 Consulate of the United States, Liverpool established.
 1791 – School for the Blind founded.
 1792 – Holy Trinity Church, Wavertree, consecrated
 1797 – Liverpool Athenaeum founded.

19th century

1800s–1840s

 1801 – Population: 77,653.
 1802 – Liverpool Library founded.
 1803 – Botanical Gardens open.
 1805 – Extension to Liverpool Town Hall completed providing the main ballroom and council chamber
 1807
 185 Liverpool ships were engaged in the slave trade, carrying 49,213 slaves in 1807.
 March – Slave Trade Act in the United Kingdom and Act Prohibiting Importation of Slaves in the United States outlaw the Atlantic slave trade. On 27 July Kitty's Amelia sails on the last legal British slaving voyage.
 Liverpool Cricket Club formed.
 1809 – Exchange Buildings constructed.

 1810
 Borough Gaol built.
 Williamson Tunnels started.
 1812 – Literary and Philosophical Society founded.
 1815 – Manchester Dock built.
 1816 – Leeds and Liverpool Canal constructed.
 1817 – Liverpool Royal Institution established.
 1819 – SS Savannah completes first steamship transatlantic sailing.
 1822
 Apprentices' Library founded.
 The old St John's Market was designed by John Foster Junior and built.
 1823 – Marine Humane Society founded.
 1825 – Liverpool Mechanics' School of Arts and Philomathic Society established.
 1826
 St James Cemetery laid out.
 Old Dock closed.
 1827 – Law Society established.
 1828 – Borough Sessions House built.
 1829 – Canning Dock opens.
 1830
 Opening of the Liverpool and Manchester Railway.
 Crown Street railway station and the first ever train shed opened.
 Wapping Tunnel opened.
 Liver Theatre active.
 1831 – Population: 165,175.
 1832
 Church of St Luke built.
 John Swire and Sons in business.
 1833 – Zoological gardens open.
 1835
 City boundaries expand.
 First elected Town Council replaces Common Council.
 1836
 The Liverpool Stock Exchange was founded known as 'The Liverpool Sharebrokers' Association'
 Liverpool Anti-Slavery Society active (approximate date).
 Literary, Scientific and Commercial Institution and Liverpool Town Borough Police established.
 Liverpool Lime Street railway station opens to the public.
 1837 – Liverpool Chess Club formed.
 1838 – Brougham Institute and Polytechnic Society established.
 1839
 Customs House built.
 Northern Mechanics' Institution and Tradesmen's Institution founded.
 1840
 Liverpool College and Liverpool Philharmonic Society founded.
 Cunard's steamship Britannia sails from Liverpool to Boston.
 1842
 St. Francis Xavier's College established.
 Robertson Gladstone becomes mayor.
 1843 – Princes Park laid out.
 1844
 Canning Half Tide Dock opens.
 Royal Mersey Yacht Club established.
 1845 – Liverpool Observatory built.
 1846 – Albert Dock opens.
 1848
 Liverpool, Crosby and Southport Railway opened.
 Liverpool Financial Reform Association; Architectural and Archaeological Society; and Historic Society of Lancashire and Cheshire formed.
 Cope Bros & Co in business.
 Church of Saint Francis Xavier consecrated.
 1849
 Philharmonic Hall opens.
 Victoria Tunnel (Liverpool) and Waterloo Tunnel opened connecting Edge Hill railway station to Liverpool Riverside railway station.

1850s–1890s
 1850 – Catholic Institute established.
 1851
 Derby Museum opens.
 Balfour Williamson in business.
 Collins Line SS Baltic (1850) sails Liverpool-New York in under ten days breaking transatlantic record.
 1852
 African Steamship Company in business.
 Liverpool Free Public Library and sailors' home open.
 Hebrews' Educational Institution founded.
 A quarter of the city's population is Irish, a legacy of the Great Irish Famine.
 1854 – St George's Hall built.
 1855
 February: Economic unrest.
 Liverpool Daily Post begins publication.
 1856 – Lewis's shop in business.
 1857 – Mersey Docks & Harbour Board established.
 1859 – Thomas Royden & Sons in business.
 1860 – William Brown Library and Museum building opens.
 1862 – Grand Olympic Festival begins.
 1863 – Liverpool Amateur Photographic Association founded.
 1864 – Garston and Liverpool Railway opened.
 Oriel Chambers built.
 1866 – Star Music Hall opens.
 1867 – Alliance Israélite Universelle branch founded.
 1868
 Elder Dempster and Company in business.
 Newsham Park opens.
 Owen Owen opens his drapery business.
 1869
 First paternoster lift built in Liverpool.
 West Coast Main Line connecting Liverpool to London bypassing Manchester completed.
 The Conservative local authority builds the first council housing in Europe, St Martin's Cottages (tenement flats) in Ashfield Street, Vauxhall.
 Fowler's Buildings constructed.
 Liverpool Tramways Company opened.
 1870
 Stanley Park opens.
 Greek Orthodox Church of St Nicholas built.
 Incorporated Society of Liverpool Accountants formed.
 1871 – North Western Hotel built.
 1872
 Sefton Park opens.
 Midland Railway Goods Warehouse built.
 1873
 Liverpool–Manchester lines opened by Cheshire Lines Committee.
 1874
 Liverpool Central railway station opens.
 Liverpool Institute High School for Girls established.
 Princes Road Synagogue consecrated.
 1877 – Walker Art Gallery opens.
 1878 – Everton football club founded.
 1879
 Picton Reading Room built.
 Liverpool Echo newspaper begins publication.
 Salvation Army active.
 North Liverpool Extension Line outer rail loop opens.
 1880
 Liverpool attains city status.
 Aigburth Cricket Ground built.
 1881 – University College Liverpool chartered.
 Liverpool Central High Level railway station introduced 40 minute journey services to Manchester Central.
 1884
 Anfield (athletic space) opens.
 County Sessions House, Gustav Adolf Church, and Picton Clock Tower built.
 Everton Road drill hall completed.
 1886
 Mersey Railway Tunnel opens; Mersey Railway (Birkenhead-Liverpool) begins operating.
 Liverpool and Birkenhead Women's Peace and Arbitration Association organized.
 1887 – Liverpool Muslim Institute founded.
 1888 – Shakespeare Theatre opens.
 1889 – Liverpool removed from Lancashire as Lancashire County Palatine replaced.
 Florence Institute for Boys established in Dingle.
 1890
 Liverpool and North Wales Steamship Company began operating.
 Liverpool Union of Girls' Clubs formed.
 Bowes Museum of Japanese Art Work opens.
 1892
 Goodison Park (athletic field) inaugurated.
 Victoria Building, University of Liverpool constructed.
 Robert Durning Holt becomes mayor.
 Liverpool Football Club formed.
 1893 – Liverpool Overhead Railway begins operating.
 1895 – City boundaries expand to include West Derby and others.
 1897 – Gregson Memorial Institute built.
 1898
 Liverpool School of Tropical Medicine founded.
 White Star Building constructed.
 Liverpool Tramways Company closed.
 1899 – Liverpool University Press founded.
 1899–1900 – George's Dock closed and filled in.
 1900 – Major alternations to Liverpool Town Hall.

20th century

1900s–1940s
 1901 – Population: 684,958.
 1902
 City boundaries expand to include Aigburth, Cressington and Grassendale.
 Sefton Park Gazette begins publication.
 1903 – Worlds first full conversion of steam to electric railway, Mersey Railway.
 1904 – Foundation stone of the Anglican Cathedral is laid by King Edward VII.
 1906 – Liverpool Cotton Exchange Building constructed.
 1907 – 
 August: 700th anniversary of city founding.
 Dock Office built.
 1908
 Meccano Ltd in business.
 Population: 753,203.
 1909
 June: Catholic-Protestant conflict.
 The world's first Department of Civic Design, which later spawns the town planning movement, is set up at the University of Liverpool.
 1911
 1911 Liverpool general transport strike.
 Royal Liver Building constructed.
 Rodewald Concert Society founded.
 1912 – Lime Street Picture House opens.
 1913 – Crane's Music Hall opens.
 1914
 14 March: Reconstructed Adelphi Hotel is opened by the Midland Railway.
 30 May: Cunarder  begins her maiden voyage to New York.
 27 August: Edward Stanley, 17th Earl of Derby, launches the Liverpool Pals battalions scheme.
 1916 – 30 July: "Liverpool's blackest day" – 500 men in Liverpool Pals battalions are killed in an attack on Guillemont in the Battle of the Somme (following 200 deaths on the First day on the Somme).
 1917
 Cunard Building constructed.
 Liverpool Commercial Reference Library opens.
 1919
 Racial conflict.
 Cunard's luxury liner services moved to Southampton.
 1922 – African Churches Mission, and African and West Indian Mission organized.
 1924–1932 – India Buildings is built.
 1925 – Empire Theatre opens.
 1927
 A5058 road Queens Drive ring road completed.
 Woolton Picture House cinema opens.
 1928 – Ferries to Eastham Ferry cease operation.
 1930 – Speke Airport begins operating.
 1931 – Population 855,688. This is the peak size of Liverpool's population.
1932 – 1932 Summer Olympics gold medal for town planning awarded to John Hughes (architect) for city of Liverpool sports stadium.
 1934
 18 July: Royal opening of Queensway Tunnel, the A580 road (Liverpool–East Lancashire Road, the UK's first intercity highway) and Walton Hall Park.
 Paramount Theatre opens.
 1938 – Liverpool Zoological Park closed.
 1939 – Exchange Flags building completed.
 1940 – August: Liverpool Blitz: Aerial bombing by German forces begins.
 1942 – January: Liverpool Blitz: Aerial bombing by German forces ends.
 1944 – Merseyside Unity Theatre active.
 1946 – Liverpool Corporation begins development of Kirkby Industrial Estate on a former ordnance factory site.
 1948 – 31 May: Canada Dock Branch railway closed to intermediate passengers.
 1949 – 19 March: Cameo murder.

1950s–1990s

 1951 – Ditton dodger train service withdrawn.
 1952 – City twinned with Cologne, Germany.
 1953 – Liverpool Muslim Society founded.
 1955 – Stirling Moss wins the British Grand Prix at Aintree
 1956 – 30 December: Liverpool Overhead Railway urban rail transit system with fourteen stations last runs amid protest against closure.
 1957
 15 January: The Cavern Club opens as a jazz club.
 6 July: John Lennon and Paul McCartney of The Beatles first meet at a garden fete at St. Peter's Church, Woolton, at which Lennon's skiffle group, The Quarrymen (formed 1956), is playing (and in the graveyard of which an Eleanor Rigby is buried).
 7 August: The Quarrymen first play at The Cavern Club in an interlude spot between jazz bands; when John Lennon starts the group playing an Elvis Presley number, the club's owner at this time hands him a note reading "Cut out the bloody rock 'n roll".
 14 September: Liverpool Corporation Tramways close after the last tram runs in Liverpool, 88 years after the first.
 1958 – Liverpool Metropolitan Cathedral crypt completed to the design of Edwin Lutyens, but the remainder of his cathedral design is abandoned.
 1960
 January: John Lennon's Liverpool College of Art friend Stu Sutcliffe joins his rock group and suggests they change their name to The Beatals.
 22 June: Fire in Henderson's department store kills eleven.
 1 August: The Beatles make their first appearance under this name in Hamburg, Germany.
 1961
 9 February (lunchtime): The Beatles at The Cavern Club: The Beatles perform under this name at The Cavern Club for the first time following their return from Hamburg, George Harrison's first appearance at the venue. On 21 March they play the first of nearly 300 regular performances at the club.
 6 July: Mersey Beat begins publication.
 9 November: Future manager Brian Epstein first sees The Beatles at The Cavern Club.
 1962
 24 January: Brian Epstein signs a contract to manage The Beatles.
 16 September: Liverpool and North Wales Steamship Company makes its last sailings.
 1963 – 3 August: The Beatles perform at The Cavern Club for the final time as they begin a run of chart success.
 1964
 Everyman Theatre founded.
 St. John's Market demolished.
 Sheil Park, three 22 storey towers (containing 516 flats) approved and later built.
 1965 – Shankland Plan including Churchill Way flyovers and 'walkways in the sky' published by Council Planner Graeme Shankland.
 1966 – 24 hours a day, 7 days a week operation and new runway 09/28 suitable for jet aircraft at Liverpool Airport opened by Prince Philip.
 Merseyside Area land use Transportation study (MALTS) project report.
Liverpool Pullman introduced.
 1967
 14 May: Liverpool Metropolitan Cathedral (Roman Catholic) consecrated.
 c. July–August: Liverpool Cotton Exchange Building partially demolished.
 The Mersey Sound anthology of Liverpool poets published.
 22 November: BBC Radio Merseyside launched.
 1968 – 30 January: RMS Franconia makes Cunard Line’s last scheduled voyage from Liverpool.
 Fifteen Guinea Special last mainline passenger steam locomotive service.
 1969
 Radio City Tower built.
 St. John's Shopping Centre and Clayton Square Shopping Centre in business.
 Merseyside Passenger Transport Executive begins operation.
 Garston extension railway closed.
 1970
 The last express services to Glasgow ran from Exchange on Sunday 3rd May 1970. 
 Harrison Barnard & Co. headquartered in city.
 Flyovers opened on Churchill Way.
 1971
 Ferry service to New Brighton withdrawn.
 Kingsway Tunnel opens.
 1972
 Albert Dock closed. Seaforth Dock opens near city in the area of Seaforth, Lancashire.
 North Liverpool Extension Line closed after a century's operation and track lifted.
 Waterloo Tunnel/ Victoria Tunnel (Liverpool) (serving Waterloo branch from Edge Hill railway station to Liverpool Riverside railway station) and Wapping Tunnel closed, 123 years after opening.
 Liverpool Central High Level railway station closed.
 Canadian Pacific unit CP Ships are the last transatlantic line to operate from Liverpool.
1973 – Prince's Landing Stage at Pier Head demolished.
 1974
 City becomes a metropolitan borough within the newly created metropolitan county of Merseyside; Merseyside County Council established.
 Post & Echo Building and New Hall Place constructed.
 Al-Rahma Mosque established.
 M57 motorway outer ring road completed and opened.
 Church Street pedestrianised.
 1976 – M62 motorway junctions 4 to 6 (Tarbock) connecting Leeds and Manchester to Liverpool completed and opened.
 1977
 26 September: Fire at St. John's Shopping Centre.
 Merseyrail formed and Liverpool Exchange railway station closed after 127 years and partially turned into a car park. Moorfields railway station opened on new loop Wirral line (3 January 1978) to replace Exchange. Lancashire and Yorkshire Railway branch line severed with buffer at Kirkby ending through trains to Manchester.
 1978 – 25 October: Construction of the Anglican Liverpool Cathedral is completed after 74 years.
Garston railway reopened. The Garston line formed the southern portion of Merseyrail's Northern Line.
 1979 – 17/18 December: Fire at St. John's Shopping Centre.
 1980 – Merseyside Maritime Museum opens in the Albert Dock complex.
 1981 – July: Toxteth riots. Chancellor Sir Geoffrey Howe circulates a cabinet memo arguing for "managed decline".
 1982 – Mersey Television formed.
 1983 – Militant in Liverpool win control of the council.
 1984 – Albert Dock reopened as a leisure attraction. International Garden Festival held.
 1985
 Militant in Liverpool set illegal council budget.
 May: Liverpool trading floor finally ceases to exist.
 1986
 Liverpool Airport Southern Terminal opens.
 Silver Blades Ice Rink, Prescot Road closed.
 1987
 Gerard Gardens closed.
 Brookside begins broadcasting.
 1988 – Tate Liverpool (modern art museum) opens in the Albert Dock.
 1989 – 15 April: Hillsborough disaster: 96 Liverpool F.C. supporters are killed as the result of a crush at a Sheffield stadium.
 1991 – Population: 452,450 residents.
 1992
 Cream (nightclub) begins.
 Africa Oyé music festival begins.
 Liverpool Community College established.
 1993
 Museum of Liverpool Life opens.
 Liverpool Mathew Street Music Festival begins.
 1995 – Liverpool dockers' dispute (1995–98) begins.
 1996 – Festival Gardens closes. National Conservation Centre opens.
 1998 – Mike Storey becomes Liverpool City Council leader.
 1999 – Liverpool Biennial begins.

21st century

 2001
 Liverpool Wall of Fame unveiled.
 Merseytram proposed.
 2002 – Liverpool International Tennis Tournament begins.
 2003 – 4 November: Brookside last broadcast.
 2004
 Liverpool Maritime Mercantile City registered as a World Heritage Site with UNESCO.
 Liverpool Culture Company formed.
 Homotopia (festival) begins.
 2006
 Liverpool Urban Area established.
 Liverpool Science Park established.
 Royal Standard art gallery established on Mann St.
Liverpool South Parkway railway station opened.
 2007
 Liverpool Cruise Terminal opens.
 International Slavery Museum opens.
 West Tower built.
 Liverpool Shakespeare Festival begins.
 David Moores sells Liverpool F.C. to American entrepreneurs Tom Hicks and George N. Gillett Jr.
 2008
 City designated a European Capital of Culture.
 Echo Arena Liverpool, BT Convention Centre and Liverpool One open.
 One Park West and Alexandra Tower built.
 A.F.C. Liverpool formed in response to the transfer of ownership of Liverpool F.C..
 2010 – National Oceanography Centre established.
 2011 – Museum of Liverpool opens on the waterfront.
 2010–2012 – Edge Lane widened.
 2012
 Directly elected office of Mayor of Liverpool established and Joe Anderson becomes mayor.
 Ocean Countess sets sail starting from Liverpool Cruise Terminal.
 2013
 19 December: Liverpool Post last published.
 Merseytram proposal cancelled without having been built.
 Yellow Duckmarine sinks in Salthouse Dock and ceases operations.
 Cunard Line resume cruising from Liverpool with Queen Mary 2, the largest ocean liner ever built.
 2014
Liverpool City Region Combined Authority established including Liverpool, Halton, Knowsley, St Helens, Sefton and Wirral.
Liverpool TV launched.
2015 – City of Liverpool F.C. formed.
 2016 – Liverpool2 container shipping port opened at Seaforth.
 2017
 8 May: Metro Mayor of the Liverpool City Region established including Liverpool, Halton, Knowsley, St Helens, Sefton and Wirral. Steve Rotheram is the first person elected to the office.
 Royal Institute of British Architects’ National Architecture Centre opened.
 2019
 Churchill Way flyovers demolition begins.
 First black Lord Mayor of Liverpool, Anna Rothery, appointed.
 2020
 23 March: Liverpool goes onto a nationwide lockdown with the rest of the UK due to the COVID-19 pandemic.
 25 June: Liverpool F.C. win the 2019–20 Premier League, their first victory of the Premier League era.
 31 July: Woolton Picturehouse announces its closure.
 6 October: VOI e-scooter-sharing system launched in Liverpool.
 14 October: COVID-19 pandemic in the United Kingdom: Liverpool moves to the Tier 3 (very high) level of restriction.
 6 November: First UK covid mass testing piloted in Liverpool.
 4 December: 5 men, including current city mayor Joe Anderson and former deputy city council leader Derek Hatton, are arrested on suspicion of conspiracy to commit bribery and witness intimidation as part of an investigation into the awarding of public building contracts in the city.
 2021
 30 April: COVID-19 pandemic in the United Kingdom: Liverpool is the venue for a trial indoor music event.
 6 May: Joanne Anderson is elected city Mayor of Liverpool, the first directly elected black woman mayor of a major British city.
21 July: Liverpool Maritime Mercantile City delisted as a World Heritage Site with UNESCO.
2022
12 August:Liverpool shortlisted to host Eurovision 2023.
7 October:Liverpool selected to host Eurovision 2023.

See also
 History of Liverpool
 List of Lord Mayors of Liverpool

References

Further reading

Published in the 18th century

Published in the 19th century

1800s–1840s

1850s–1890s

Published in the 20th century

1900s–1940s 
 
 
 
 
 
 
 
  (includes Liverpool)

1950s–1990s

Published in the 21st century

External links

 
 
 . Includes digitized directories of Liverpool, various dates
 Digital Public Library of America. Works related to Liverpool, various dates
 

Years in England
Liverpool-related lists
 
Liverpool
Liverpool